The Northwest Championship is an unofficial Division I FBS football rivalry series title earned by way of an undefeated sweep of the other three fellow Pac-12 teams located in the Pacific Northwest states of Oregon and Washington.

Oregon, Oregon State, Washington, and Washington State first played each other in a round-robin format in the 1903 season. As geographic neighbors and members of the former Pacific Coast Conference and current Pac-12 Conference North Division, each team has generally played the others annually. Among the Ducks, Beavers, Huskies, and Cougars there exist three traditional football rivalries: Oregon–Oregon State, Oregon–Washington, and Washington–Washington State.

The feat's "Northwest Championship" moniker was coined by Rick Neuheisel, head coach of the 2002 Washington Huskies. After a string of disappointing losses, he challenged his players to win the newly conceived title by defeating their northwest rivals in the season's remaining games.

The Northwest Championship has been described as a "so-called", "fictitious", and "mythical" title, invented by Neuheisel only to motivate his 2002 team. Nevertheless, in the years following the Huskies' original claim of the title, other teams have continued to be cited as winning the Northwest Championship upon completing the sweep.

Teams

The Northwest Championship involves the four Pacific Northwest teams currently playing football in the North Division of the Pac-12 Conference. Oregon, Oregon State, Washington, and Washington State generally play each other annually in a 6-game round-robin series. Three of the six games are heated rivalry games, and all of the games represent some of the most-played college football series.

 Oregon Ducks football
 Oregon State Beavers football
 Washington Huskies football
 Washington State Cougars football

Other Northwest teams 

Since its introduction, it has been unclear if other football schools in the Pacific Northwest are eligible to win the Northwest Championship. Washington beat Idaho in 2002, but they were not mentioned in Neuheisel's conception of the title. Boise State beat Oregon in 2008 and 2009, years where Oregon swept its in-conference northwest foes, and has been mentioned as potentially deserving a spot in the series.

2002 Origin

In his fourth year as head coach, Neuheisel's 2002 team was floundering. In early November they had a 4–5 record, 1–4 against Pac-10 opponents, and had lost 4 of the last 5 games. The Huskies were at serious risk of a losing season, their first since 1976, and of missing a bowl game.

Through rare happenstance, Washington was scheduled to play the three other Pacific Northwest schools in order to end the season. Neuheisel, sensing an opportunity to motivate his team, declared that despite the thus far disappointing season the Huskies were still fighting to win the "Northwest Championship" by sweeping Oregon State, Oregon, and Washington State in their remaining games.

It was a successful rallying cry, and the Huskies first beat Oregon State. The next week they won at Autzen Stadium, their first win against Oregon at home since 1996. The Huskies capped the season with a triple-overtime victory in Pullman over No. 3 Washington State in the Apple Cup, claiming the Northwest Championship with back-to-back-to-back wins over the other northwest schools.

Trophy

No trophy is awarded to the Northwest Champion, and no organization grants the title.

In 2002, the Huskies wore homemade t-shirts to mark their progress towards the Northwest Championship. The football undershirts had three blank boxes labeled for the other northwest schools, which the players checked off after each win.

Results

The Washington Huskies were successful in claiming the newly coined Northwest Championship in 2002. Since then, Oregon and Oregon State have both also won the title and been called Northwest Champions by local media. Washington State has yet to complete the sweep in the years since the title was named, but several times has been on the hunt going into the end-of-season Apple Cup.

Historical results have been compiled for prior years by the school athletic departments, local media, and fans of the football programs.

The four teams first met in a six-game round-robin fashion in the 1903 season. This was also the first season in which any of the teams played all three of the others.

* Years in which no sweep was possible due to no single team playing all three of the others.

 Number of games played, of the possible 6-game round-robin series. If no annotation, all 6 games were played.

 The series was disrupted by World War II, with only Washington fielding a team in 1943 and 1944. In 1945 each team played the others twice, for a total of 12 games.

† The "Northwest Championship" name was coined in 2002.

References

College football rivalries in the United States
Oregon Ducks football
Oregon State Beavers football
Washington Huskies football
Washington State Cougars football